Methods of successive approximation are a category of strategies in pure and applied mathematics. 

Successive approximation also may refer to:
 Successive approximation ADC, analog-to-digital-conversion method appropriate for signal processing
 Shaping, behaviorist-psychology strategy of conditioning subtle behaviors only after conditioning gross behaviors

See also
 Homing (disambiguation), e.g. homing in on a goal
 Honing (disambiguation), e.g. honing down a cutting tool